Yashashree Bhave is an Indian singer from Satara, Maharashtra. She was a participant in Indian Idol Season 2.

Early life
Born in 1981, Bhave hails from Satara, Maharashtra. She started her career in Nagpur and currently lives in Mumbai. She has performed at several stage shows and worked on various projects with leading artists of the industry.

In 2001, Bhave was the runner-up in Sa Re Ga Ma Pa, aired on Zee Marathi.

Discography
 Album: Mai Toh Ho Gai Re Sajna Teri – Zee Music Company
 Album: Chalo Jaye Maiyya Ke Dwar
 "Ae Dil-E-Nadan" (Album: Indian Idol 2)
 "Woh Pehli Baar" (Album: Indian Idol 2)

Playback Singer
 Chooti Se Umer (Movie: Ek Hakikat Ganga
 Movie: Bhala Manus

Indian Idol 2 performances

Audition
 Ruke Ruke se Kadam (Lata Mangeshkar)
 The judges liked it, especially Sonu Nigam.

Theater round
 Piya Bawri (Asha Bhonsle)
 The judges appreciated her performance, particularly the sargam.
 Aisa Lagta Hai Jo Na Hua (Alka Yagnik)
 Sonu Nigam said, "I am very happy to hear you sing this song". Anu Malik, the music director of the song, was also happy.
 Kehna hi Kya (K.S Chithra)
 Sonu Nigam couldn't believe that Bhave was singing the song. He felt like Chithra was only singing it.

Piano round
 Aayiye Aajaayiye (Anuradha Sriram)

References

External links
 Gaana
 Saavn
 Hungama
 YouTube

1981 births
Living people
Indian Idol participants
Indian women singers
Musicians from Maharashtra